Mary Connie Livuza Mpanga is a politician in Malawi.

Mpanga represents Phalombe South in the National Assembly of Malawi.

References

Living people
Members of the National Assembly (Malawi)
21st-century Malawian politicians
Year of birth missing (living people)